is a Japanese singer, actress and model. She is a former sixth-generation member and former leader of the J-pop group Morning Musume. Following the departure of fifth-generation member Risa Niigaki on October 12, 2013, Michishige has the longest tenure of any member in the group's history.

Michishige was born in Ube, Yamaguchi Prefecture, Japan. She joined Morning Musume in 2003 along with Eri Kamei, Miki Fujimoto, and Reina Tanaka, who all debuted with Morning Musume on the group's nineteenth single, "Shabondama". In 2005, she was assigned as mentor to seventh-generation member Koharu Kusumi, until Kusumi left the group in December 2009. Michishige was also a member of the Hello! Project unit Ecomoni, along with former Morning Musume member Rika Ishikawa.

She portrays a visual-focused, self-confident image of herself in more TV shows, often calling herself the cutest member in Morning Musume and saying that her cuteness overwhelms her poor singing skills. In one of the skits known as Hello! Morning Theatre on their variety show, Hello! Morning, she frequently played a character known as "Ichiban Kawaii" (Cutest).

Biography

Early life and family 
Michishige is from Ube, Yamaguchi. She is the youngest child in the family, she has an elder brother and an elder sister.

Morning Musume Career (2003–2014) 
In 2002, at the age of 13, Michishige participated in the Love Audition 2002 held by Up-Front Agency in search of new members for the Japanese female idol group Morning Musume. Tens of thousand of contestants auditioned, but only four where chosen in the final stage. Michishige, along with Eri Kamei, Miki Fujimoto, and Reina Tanaka were admitted to Morning Musume as sixth-generation members on January 19, 2003.

A few weeks later, she was placed in Morning Musume's subgroup Morning Musume Otomegumi, when the group was temporarily divided so it could perform in smaller towns, thereby reaching out to a greater number of fans who could not otherwise watch them perform live. During the spring, she, along with the other sixth-generation members, made her first concert appearance on the Morning Musume Concert Tour 2003 Spring "Non Stop!" during second-generation member Kei Yasuda's leaving ceremony.

On July 16, 2003, the sixth-generation members (with the exception of Miki Fujimoto) released their first photobook and corresponding DVD, both shot in Hawaii, as part of the  series. Their musical debut came shortly thereafter, on July 30, with Morning Musume's 19th single, "Shabondama". Towards the end of 2003, Michishige began appearing in the show , as a regular with ex-Morning Musume member Yuko Nakazawa.

2004 saw her first appearance on an album, Best! Morning Musume 2, and in a movie—. During the summer, Michishige appeared in her first solo photobook and was placed in a temporary unit called Ecomoni with fourth-generation Morning Musume member Rika Ishikawa. Originally, the goal of the group was to promote environmental awareness only for the duration of the  festival, but their popularity led to the members being cast as voice actors for the fourth Hamtaro movie—along with Hello! Project soloist Aya Matsuura, with whom they also released the main theme for the film, titled —and appeared in subsequent festivals.

In 2005, Michshige and Rika Ishikawa released a duo photobook titled . Michishige also appeared as a regular news anchor on Hello! Morning for most of the second half of 2005. That year, she was assigned to be a mentor to seventh-generation member Koharu Kusumi, with whom she formed a duo called Rainbow Pink in the beginning of 2006.

Following in fellow Morning Musume member Miki Fujimoto's footsteps, Michishige began hosting a radio show titled  in October 2006. Running approximately 30 minutes per episode, Michishige's show consisted of her answering fan mail and participating in several games, among which saying a given phrase/expression in reverse, and giving general advice to her listeners.

Michishige's second solo photobook, titled , was published on January 15, 2007. Shot in Okinawa, the book featured school uniform, swimsuit, simple one-piece, and wet yukata/bathrobe shots, in an attempt to convey a more mature image of the seventeen-year-old idol.

On June 9, 2007, Michishige began co-hosting the Young Town radio show as a result of Miki Fujimoto's Friday magazine scandal and subsequent resignation from Morning Musume. Shortly thereafter she released her third solo photobook and DVD, 17: Love Hello, both shot on the island of Guam. Her fourth solo photobook, Sōsō, was published in December 2007.

On January 3, 2009, for the first time since she joined Morning Musume, Michishige appeared as an independent talent on a TV show, namely the  quiz show. A cast of 30 performers (including former v-u-den member Yui Okada and former second-generation Morning Musume member Mari Yaguchi) gathered to answer a series of questions taken from elementary school textbooks. From a total of 60 questions she managed to score 22 (37%) and placed 29th. Later that year, Michishige was assigned to be a part of the new shuffle group zoku v-u-den, a revival of v-u-den, along with Risako Sugaya (of Berryz Kobo) and Junjun (also of Morning Musume).

When Risa Niigaki left on May 18, 2012, Sayumi Michishige was declared the new Morning Musume leader.

On April 29, 2014, during the Morning Musume '14 Concert Tour Haru: Evolution concert in Yamaguchi, Michishige announced her graduation from Morning Musume and Hello! Project. She is set to leave during Morning Musume's Fall 2014 concert tour. With her exit announced for Morning Musume's Fall 2014 concert tour, the group consisted only of the three most recent generations since the introduction of the fourth-generation members in 2000. On November 26, 2014, she graduated from Morning Musume and Hello! Project, and in her place, Mizuki Fukumura was named group leader.

Post Morning Musume/Comeback Announcement (2014–2016) 
After graduating, Michishige announced that she will take time to rest her mind and body and citied a possible comeback in the future.

On October 2 of 2016, Michishige posted an entry in her blog after two years of absence. After that post she has been regularly updating her blog.

On November 26, she posted on her blog entry, "Michishige Sayumi Saisei" (道重さゆみ再生; Michishige Sayumi Rebirth) in hiragana, and in it she announced that would be resuming activities starting spring 2017.

Solo artist activities (2017–) 

Currently Michishige is working under Up Front Promotion. Her performance SAYUMINGLANDOLL ran in March and July at the Cotton Club.

Works

Photobooks

Books

Singles

Other songs

Best albums

Original soundtrack albums

Video albums

Video games

Movies

Stage

Series

Television

Radio

References

External links 

 Official blog 
 

1989 births
Japanese female idols
21st-century Japanese women singers
21st-century Japanese singers
Japanese child singers
Japanese women pop singers
Japanese radio personalities
Living people
Morning Musume members
V-u-den members
Voice actresses from Yamaguchi Prefecture
Musicians from Yamaguchi Prefecture